Mikayel Chamchian (4 December 1738 – 30 November 1823), known also in English as Michael Chamich, was an Armenian Mekhitarist monk, historian, grammarian and theologian. He is best known for writing a comprehensive and influential history of Armenia in three volumes.

Biography
Mikayel Chamchian (whose baptismal name was Karapet) was born in Constantinople in 1738 to Abraham Chamchian. He received his primary education in Constantinople's Catholic schools, then was trained as a jeweler by his distant relative, the imperial jeweler and amira Mikayel Chelebi Duzian. Although Chamchian gained renown as a jeweler and had the opportunity to join Duzian as a full business partner, he instead decided to abandon secular life and join the Mekhitarist Congregation. In March 1757, Chamchian left for the Mekhitarists' monastery on the island of San Lazzaro degli Armeni in Venice with a letter of recommendation from Mekhitarist fathers Mikayel Sebastatsi and Mkrtich Ananian and entered the Mekhitarist monastic academy․ He took his monastic vows in 1759 and took the name Mikayel in honor of Mikayel Sebastatsi. Chamchian's elder brother Hakobos was also a Mekhitarist monk. After graduating from the academy in 1762, he was ordained priest and became a teacher at the monastery. It was at this time that Chamchian began researching and collecting materials for his future writings, although this work was interrupted in 1769 when Abbot Stepanos Melkonian ordained him vardapet and sent him to conduct missionary activities and tend to the spiritual needs of the Catholic Armenian community in Basra.

During his time a missionary, Chamchian visited various Armenian communities in the Near East and sought out Armenian manuscripts—histories of Armenia in particular—to acquire or copy and send back to San Lazzaro. Chamchian returned to Venice in 1775 due to his poor health (exacerbated by the climate and outbreak of plague in Basra) and taught novices seeking to join the Mekhitarist Congregation. In 1779 he published his Kerakanutiun Haykazian Lezvi (Քերականութիւն Հայկազեան լեզուի, "Grammar of the Armenian Language"), which was regarded as the best existing Classical Armenian grammar textbook for nearly a century and found wide use in Armenian schools. Chamchian's grammar was the first to reject Latin influence on Armenian grammar and was based on the study of select Classical Armenian texts from the 5th to 13th centuries. 

In 1785–1788 he published his monumental three-volume Patmutiun Hayots ("History of Armenia", inaccurately dated to 1784–1786). In this work, Chamchian sought to present a comprehensive history of Armenia from Creation to his own time using various Armenian and non-Armenian sources. He was meticulous in writing the history, frequently making changes and additions and delaying the final publication of the volumes in order to consult more sources as they became available to him. Chamchian's History was the most popular Armenian history for nearly a hundred years. It was highly influential among Armenians and is credited with strengthening Armenian national consciousness. It has also been criticized for failing to approach many of its sources criticically and for "frequently accept[ing] sheer legends as solid facts." The History is divided into periods according to ruling Armenian dynasties and times of foreign domination. Chamchian provided a chronology for the legendary Armenian patriarchs (using the one laid down by Movses Khorenatsi in his History of Armenia as his source), dating Hayk's battle with Belus, and thus the formation of the Armenian people, to 2107 BC. He is also the source for the traditionally accepted date for the Christianization of Armenia as 301 AD. An abridged version of Chamchian's History was published in 1811 and it was later translated into English and Turkish.

The immense labor of writing and publishing History of Armenia took its toll on Chamchian's health, and in 1789 he was dismissed from his teaching position and sent to recover at sanatoria in Austria and Hungary. He first went to Trieste, then to the Armenian-populated Transylvanian town of Ibașfalău (Bashbalov or Yeghisabetupolis in Armenian, now called Dumbrăveni), where he remained until April 1790. While in Ibașfalău, Chamchian contributed greatly to the development of the local Armenian school and cultivated a plan for the creation of Armenian boarding schools. Despite the pleas of the local Armenian community for him to remain, Chamchian returned to Venice after recovering his health. His next major work was a commentary on the Book of Psalms (Meknutiun Saghmosats, 10 volumes), and most of his works from this period are on religious and theological subjects. He was sent away from Venice once again due to health reasons to his birthplace, Constantinople, in early 1795. There, Chamchian acted as a senior Mekhitarist representative and resumed his historical writing and educational activities. Chamchian briefly returned to Venice in 1800 to participate in the election of the new abbot of the monastery on San Lazzaro following the death of Abbot Stepanos. Although the Mekhitarist monks attempted to keep Chamchian in Venice by appointing him supervisor of the monastic school, he returned to Constantinople at the request of the Armenian Catholic community there. In his last years in Constantinople, Chamchian, together with other Mekhitarists, took steps to ease the conflict between Armenian Catholics and the Armenian Apostolic Church, although these efforts received support neither from Rome, nor from the Armenian Catholicosate. Chamchian died in Constantinople on 30 November 1823 at the age of 86.

Notes

Footnotes

Citations

Sources

External links 

 English translation of the abridged version of Chamchian's History of Armenia, volume I and volume II

1738 births
1823 deaths
Writers from Istanbul
Armenian Eastern Catholics
18th-century Armenian historians
Armenians from the Ottoman Empire
Mekhitarists
Armenian studies scholars
San Lazzaro degli Armeni alumni